Michael Yebba (born August 5, 1974) is an American actor, screenwriter and producer. Born in St. Johns, Michigan, he was raised in South Boston, MA, from the age of 6 months.

Later career
Yebba was a Boston, MA firefighter who was fired from the department after failing drug tests. He then became a full time criminal. While in the aftermath of his arrest, Yebba began penning an autobiographical work entitled "Fallen Hero". Determined to turn his life around and keen at the possibility of telling his story and helping another avoid his situation, Yebba turned his unfinished autobiography into a screenplay named The Fallen.

Since then Yebba has had acting roles in several films and television series', including the Brian Goodman-directed What Doesn't Kill You alongside actors Ethan Hawke and Mark Ruffalo, and The Town directed by Ben Affleck and starring John Hamm, Jeremy Renner and Blake Lively. Yebba continues his writing and has since penned several feature films such as horror–slasher The Hamilton House, Angel's Guardian and Rush Back. He also has 2 television projects in development, Affair of Honor and Knocked. He appeared in season 2 of Bosch, as "Mike" a mob enforcer.

Yebba made his Directorial debut with the Award-winning short film Bad Blood and the recently completed Ordinary Man (2011) starring Ethan Embry, Brian Scannell and Ramiro Torres.

Filmography
 By the Gun (2014) - Mobster Big Victor
 In Your Eyes (2014)
 Surviving Jack (2014) - police Officer Sam Paul
 Falcon Song (2014)
 The Lookalike (2014)
 Crisis (2014-episode 11:Best Laid Plans) - FBI/HRT Commander Sniper team 1(M4 Carbine assault)(uncredited)
 Vault (2019) - Mobster Joseph Barboza in a Flashback scene

References

http://www.rottentomatoes.com/celebrity/michael_yebba/

http://www.boston.com/ae/celebrity/articles/2011/01/22/blood_filming_done/

http://www.beantown.name/profiles/blogs/slaine-and-michael-yebba-have

http://thelamovieawards.com/2011_%28I%29_Winners.html
http://thephoenix.com/Blogs/outsidetheframe/archive/2011/08/08/q-amp-a-with-southie-director-actor-michael-yebba-bad-blood-boston-premiere-featuring-slaine-this-wednesday.aspx
http://www.bostonherald.com/track/inside_track/view/20110906tracked_down_ethan_embry_jwow_patrick_chung/srvc=home&position=recent

External links
 

1974 births
Living people
American male film actors
Film producers from Massachusetts
American male screenwriters
American male television actors
People from St. Johns, Michigan
Writers from Boston
American male television writers
American television writers
Screenwriters from Massachusetts
Screenwriters from Michigan
Film producers from Michigan